Tillack is a surname. Notable people with the surname include:

Hans-Martin Tillack (born 1961), German journalist
Mark Steven Tillack, American engineer